James Wynne (born 16 September 1976) is a former France international rugby league footballer who played for the Newcastle Knights in the National Rugby League competition. Wynne also played for Lézignan Sangliers in the French Rugby League Championship.

Background
He was born in Gunnedah, New South Wales, Australia.

Club career
During the 2001 and 2002 seasons, Wynne was the number-two halfback behind Andrew Johns and was only able to secure five first-grade games. In 2003, Wynne found himself a starting position with French club, Toulouse Olympique, where he was captain.

With Toulouse he lost at home in semi-final of French championship against Lézignan.

International career
In June, 2007, Wynne was selected for France (qualifying through residency) against Great Britain where he started from the bench.

He was named in the France training squad for the 2008 Rugby League World Cup.

James was named Man Of The Match in the Rugby League World Cup win over Scotland in Canberra on Sunday 26 October 2008.

Coaching
Since September 2007 he played for French team Lézignan Sangliers, where he was captain and coach, semi-finalist 2008 in Lord Derby Cup against Limoux, Champion of France 2008 beating Pia (champion 2006 & 2007) by 28 to 16.

Post playing
Wynne now resides in Orange NSW with his wife Carly and 2 children.

Wynne acted as captain/coach for the Gunnedah Bulldogs Rugby League Club during the 2012 season.

Footnotes

References

 

1976 births
Living people
Australian rugby league coaches
Australian rugby league players
Newcastle Knights players
France national rugby league team players
Lézignan Sangliers captains
Lézignan Sangliers coaches
Lézignan Sangliers players
Rugby league five-eighths
Rugby league players from New South Wales
Toulouse Olympique captains
Toulouse Olympique players